Michael Francis Gonzalez (born March 8, 1988), also known by his stage name Mike Del Rio, is a musical artist, producer, and songwriter from New York, NY now based in Los Angeles, CA. He is the co creator and lead member of the alternative group POWERS along with songwriter, vocalist and instrumentalist Crista Ru signed to Republic Records. As a record producer, Del Rio's eclectic style and musicality has led him to work with an array of artist such as Kylie Minogue, Selena Gomez, Eminem, Christina Aguilera, CeeLo Green, Cheryl Cole, The Knocks, Skylar Grey, Jamie N Commons, and X Ambassadors. Most recently Del Rio executive produced recording artist LP latest album Lost on You containing the global hit title track "Lost on You". He is signed to Alex Da Kid's publishing company KidinaKorner distributed through Universal Music Group.

POWERS
Together with Crista Ru, he also is part of the alternative duo POWERS, which they started in late 2013. The band is signed to Republic Records.

References

External links
 www.MikeDelRio.com

Musicians from New York City
Living people
1988 births
21st-century American singers